Eats Darkness is Apostle of Hustle's third studio LP, released on May 19, 2009 to generally positive reviews. According to Andrew Whiteman, the album is "a serial poem about some struggles people go through. Battles, from the macro to the micro. Songs about tactics and attitudes needed in 'life during wartime'. Each track is like tapas at the banquet of conflict. A small contribution to the articulation of a fucked and beautiful world."

Track listing
 "Snakes" – 0:29
 "Eazy Speaks" – 3:19
 "Soul Unwind" – 5:29
 "Sign" – 1:21
 "Perfect Fit" – 3:22
 "Xerses" – 4:28
 "What Are You Talking About?" – 0:24
 "Whistle in the Fog" – 4:23
 "Eats Darkness" – 2:58
 "Return to Sender" – 0:55
 "How to Defeat a More Powerful Enemy" – 3:13
 "Nobody Bought It" – 1:11
 "Blackberry" – 4:12

References

2009 albums
Apostle of Hustle albums
Arts & Crafts Productions albums